Maurits de Baar (born 8 October 1997) is a Dutch footballer player who plays as a forward for Sparta Nijkerk in the Dutch Derde Divisie.

Club career
He made his professional debut in the Eerste Divisie for RKC Waalwijk on 8 August 2016 in a game against SC Telstar.

On 11 January 2019, de Baar left FC Lienden to join USV Hercules. After six months at Hercules, he moved to Sparta Nijkerk in the Derde Divisie.

References

External links
 
 

1997 births
Living people
Dutch footballers
RKC Waalwijk players
FC Lienden players
Sparta Nijkerk players
Eerste Divisie players
Tweede Divisie players
Association football forwards
Footballers from Utrecht (city)
FC Den Bosch players
USV Elinkwijk players
Derde Divisie players
Dutch people of American descent
USV Hercules players